Hymenasplenium cardiophyllum is a species of fern in the family Aspleniaceae. It is native to China and Japan.  Its natural habitat is subtropical or tropical moist lowland forests. It is threatened by habitat loss.

References

Aspleniaceae
Flora of China
Near threatened plants
Taxonomy articles created by Polbot
Taxobox binomials not recognized by IUCN